Dolan is an unincorporated community in Bloomington Township, Monroe County, in the U.S. state of Indiana.

History
A post office was established at Dolan in 1888, and remained in operation until 1904. The community was named for John Dolan, an early settler.

Geography

References

Unincorporated communities in Monroe County, Indiana
Unincorporated communities in Indiana
Bloomington metropolitan area, Indiana